Tara D. Sonenshine (born 1959) is an American diplomat who was the Under Secretary of State for Public Diplomacy and Public Affairs from 2012 to 2013. She is now a Distinguished Fellow at the George Washington University School of Media and Public Affairs. She was Senior Career Coach at the Elliott School of International Affairs at George Washington University from 2017 to 2020. In this role she assisted students in the Masters’ program to navigate their global careers.

In 1981, she graduated from Tufts University Phi Beta Kappa with a B.A. in political science.

Sonenshine is the recipient of 10 News Emmy Awards in broadcast journalism. She has been the Executive Vice President of United States Institute of Peace. Sonenshine served in various capacities at the White House during the Clinton Administration, including Transition Director, Director of Foreign Policy Planning and Deputy Director of Communications for the National Security Council and Special Assistant to President Bill Clinton.

She sits on the board of Silkroad, the nonprofit organization founded by cellist Yo-Yo Ma, and the advisory board for Washington, D.C. nonprofit America Abroad Media.

Sonenshine began her broadcasting career by working for ABC News in New York. She worked as a reporter at the Pentagon for ABC News, and for more than a decade she was editorial producer of ABC News’ Nightline. Also, Sonenshine has written multiple articles for newspapers like the New York Times, Boston Globe, and the Washington Post.

References

External links

 Measuring the Public Diplomacy of the Future (2012)

1959 births
Living people
United States Under Secretaries of State
Obama administration personnel
Tufts University School of Arts and Sciences alumni
United States National Security Council staffers
American women diplomats
American diplomats
21st-century American women